The group stage of the 2019 BWF World Junior Championships – Teams event is the first stage of the competition. It will hold at Kazan Gymnastics Center in Kazan, Russia, from 30 September to 5 October.

Group composition 
The draw for 41 teams competing in the tournament were announced on 4 September 2019.

Group A

Group A1

Indonesia vs Uganda

Finland vs Uganda

Indonesia vs Finland

Group A2

Spain vs Kazakhstan

Hungary vs Kazakhstan

Spain vs Hungary

Group A play-offs

Play-off A1: Indonesia vs Spain

Play-off A2: Finland vs Hungary

Play-off A3: Uganda vs Kazakhstan

Group B

Russia vs Malaysia

Canada vs Hong Kong

Macau vs Malaysia

Russia vs Hong Kong

Canada vs Malaysia

Russia vs Macau

Hong Kong vs Malaysia

Canada vs Macau

Russia vs Canada

Macau vs Hong Kong

Group C

Group C1

Thailand vs Latvia

Belarus vs Latvia

Thailand vs Belarus

Group C2

Switzerland vs Estonia

Mongolia vs Estonia

Switzerland vs Mongolia

Group C play-offs

Play-off C1: Thailand vs Switzerland

Play-off C2: Belarus vs Estonia

Play-off C3: Latvia vs Mongolia

Group D

England vs Portugal

France vs Sweden

Czech Republic vs Portugal

England vs Sweden

France vs Portugal

England vs Czech Republic

Sweden vs Portugal

France vs Czech Republic

England vs France

Czech Republic vs Sweden

Group E

India vs United States

Japan vs Armenia

Australia vs United States

India vs Armenia

Japan vs United States

India vs Australia

Armenia vs United States

Japan vs United States

India vs Japan

Australia vs Armenia

Group F

South Korea vs Peru

Singapore vs Slovakia

Sri Lanka vs Peru

South Korea vs Slovakia

Singapore vs Peru

South Korea vs Sri Lanka

Slovakia vs Peru

Singapore vs Sri Lanka

South Korea vs Singapore

Sri Lanka vs Singapore

Group G

Denmark vs New Zealand

Chinese Taipei vs Faroe Islands

Uzbekistan vs New Zealand

Denmark vs Faroe Islands

Chinese Taipei vs New Zealand

Denmark vs Uzbekistan

Faroe Islands vs New Zealand

Chinese Taipei vs Uzbekistan

Denmark vs Chinese Taipei

Uzbekistan vs Faroe Islands

Group H

Group H1

China vs Norway

Scotland vs Norway

China vs Scotland

Group H2

Germany vs Lithuania

Iceland vs Lithuania

Germany vs Iceland

Group H play-offs

References 

2019 BWF World Junior Championships